Jordan competed at the 1992 Summer Olympics in Barcelona, Spain.

Competitors
The following is the list of number of competitors in the Games.

Athletics

Men's 5.000 metres
Awwad Al-Hasini
 Heat — 14:55.58 (→ did not advance, 48th place)

Men's 10.000 metres
Awwad Al-Hasini
 Heat — 30:43.19 (→ did not advance, 47th place)

Shooting

Open

References

Official Olympic Reports

Nations at the 1992 Summer Olympics
1992
1992 in Jordanian sport